KTOM-FM (92.7 MHz, K-TOM) is a commercial radio station in Marina, California, broadcasting to the Santa Cruz-Monterey-Salinas, California, area on 92.7 FM.  Its studios are in Salinas, and the transmitter is just east of Monterey. KTOM-FM airs a country format branded as "K-Tom." KTOM used to be on 100.7 and a translator on 100.9. It moved to 92.7 when Clear Channel started to do Spanish formats.

History
Between 1998 and 2002, 92.7 was KMJO, a simulcast of 92.3 FM KSJO in San Jose, California as 92 KSJO, along with 92.7 FM KXJO in San Francisco, California and 92.1 FM KFJO in Walnut Creek, California.

References

External links
Official Website

TOM-FM
Country radio stations in the United States
Radio stations established in 1982
IHeartMedia radio stations
1982 establishments in California